Pseuderanthemum is a genus of plants in family Acanthaceae with a pantropical distribution.

Species 
The following 130 species are accepted by Plants of the World Online 

 Pseuderanthemum alatum 
 Pseuderanthemum albiflorum 
 Pseuderanthemum album 
 Pseuderanthemum angustifolium 
 Pseuderanthemum armitii 
 Pseuderanthemum arunachalense 
 Pseuderanthemum aubertii 
 Pseuderanthemum bibracteatum 
 Pseuderanthemum bicolor 
 Pseuderanthemum bracteatum 
 Pseuderanthemum bradtkei 
 Pseuderanthemum breviflos 
 Pseuderanthemum campylosiphon 
 Pseuderanthemum candidum 
 Pseuderanthemum caudifolium 
 Pseuderanthemum chaponense 
 Pseuderanthemum chilianthium 
 Pseuderanthemum chocoense 
 Pseuderanthemum cinnabarinum 
 Pseuderanthemum cladodes 
 Pseuderanthemum comptonii 
 Pseuderanthemum confertum 
 Pseuderanthemum confusum 
 Pseuderanthemum congestum 
 Pseuderanthemum coudercii 
 Pseuderanthemum crenulatum 
 Pseuderanthemum ctenospermum 
 Pseuderanthemum curtatum 
 Pseuderanthemum cuspidatum 
 Pseuderanthemum dawei 
 Pseuderanthemum detruncatum 
 Pseuderanthemum diachylum 
 Pseuderanthemum diantherum 
 Pseuderanthemum dispermum 
 Pseuderanthemum diversifolium 
 Pseuderanthemum eberhardtii 
 Pseuderanthemum ellipticum 
 Pseuderanthemum exaequatum 
 Pseuderanthemum fasciculatum 
 Pseuderanthemum floribundum 
 Pseuderanthemum fruticosum 
 Pseuderanthemum galbanum 
 Pseuderanthemum glomeratum 
 Pseuderanthemum graciliflorum 
 Pseuderanthemum grandiflorum 
 Pseuderanthemum guerrerense 
 Pseuderanthemum haikangense 
 Pseuderanthemum heterophyllum 
 Pseuderanthemum hildebrandtii 
 Pseuderanthemum hirtipistillum 
 Pseuderanthemum hispidulum 
 Pseuderanthemum hookerianum 
 Pseuderanthemum hooveri 
 Pseuderanthemum huegelii 
 Pseuderanthemum hylophilum 
 Pseuderanthemum idroboi 
 Pseuderanthemum incisum 
 Pseuderanthemum inclusum 
 Pseuderanthemum interruptum 
 Pseuderanthemum katangense 
 Pseuderanthemum kingii 
 Pseuderanthemum lanceolatum 
 Pseuderanthemum lanceophyllum 
 Pseuderanthemum lanceum 
 Pseuderanthemum lapathifolium 
 Pseuderanthemum latifolium 
 Pseuderanthemum laxiflorum 
 Pseuderanthemum leiophyllum 
 Pseuderanthemum leptanthum 
 Pseuderanthemum leptorhachis 
 Pseuderanthemum leptostachys 
 Pseuderanthemum leptostachyum 
 Pseuderanthemum liesneri 
 Pseuderanthemum lilacinum 
 Pseuderanthemum longifolium 
 Pseuderanthemum longistylum 
 Pseuderanthemum ludovicianum 
 Pseuderanthemum macgregorii 
 Pseuderanthemum macrophyllum 
 Pseuderanthemum maculatum 
 Pseuderanthemum maguirei 
 Pseuderanthemum melanesicum 
 Pseuderanthemum metallicum 
 Pseuderanthemum micranthum 
 Pseuderanthemum minutiflorum 
 Pseuderanthemum modestum 
 Pseuderanthemum muelleri-fernandii 
 Pseuderanthemum orientalis 
 Pseuderanthemum pacificum 
 Pseuderanthemum palauense 
 Pseuderanthemum paniculatum 
 Pseuderanthemum parishii 
 Pseuderanthemum pelagicum 
 Pseuderanthemum pihuamoense 
 Pseuderanthemum pittieri 
 Pseuderanthemum poilanei 
 Pseuderanthemum polyanthum 
 Pseuderanthemum potamophilum 
 Pseuderanthemum praecox 
 Pseuderanthemum pubescens 
 Pseuderanthemum pumilum 
 Pseuderanthemum racemosum 
 Pseuderanthemum repandum 
 Pseuderanthemum riedelianum 
 Pseuderanthemum selangorense 
 Pseuderanthemum shweliense 
 Pseuderanthemum siamense 
 Pseuderanthemum sneidernii 
 Pseuderanthemum sorongense 
 Pseuderanthemum standleyi 
 Pseuderanthemum stenosiphon 
 Pseuderanthemum stenostachyum 
 Pseuderanthemum subauriculatum 
 Pseuderanthemum subviscosum 
 Pseuderanthemum sumatrense 
 Pseuderanthemum sylvestre 
 Pseuderanthemum teijsmannii 
 Pseuderanthemum tenellum 
 Pseuderanthemum thailandicum 
 Pseuderanthemum thelothrix 
 Pseuderanthemum tomentellum 
 Pseuderanthemum tonkinense 
 Pseuderanthemum tunicatum 
 Pseuderanthemum usambarensis 
 Pseuderanthemum variabile 
 Pseuderanthemum velutinum 
 Pseuderanthemum verapazense 
 Pseuderanthemum verbenaceum 
 Pseuderanthemum viriduliflorum 
 Pseuderanthemum weberbaueri

References

External links
 
 

 
Acanthaceae genera
Taxonomy articles created by Polbot